"Love Bites (So Do I)" is a song by American rock band, Halestorm. It is the first single from their second album The Strange Case Of..., released April 10, 2012. It is also part of the Guitar Hero Live soundtrack.

Background
The band members have stated that "Love Bites" was influenced by their cover of Skid Row's song "Slave to the Grind" and Lamb of God. Lzzy Hale also mentioned on an episode of That Metal Show that thrash metal bands like Megadeth and Anthrax were influences for the song.

Reception
The song elicited a positive reaction from music critics. Gregory Heaney, in his AllMusic review of the song's parent album, praised vocalist Lzzy Hale's vocal performance, commenting that they were "adding the right amount of snarl and grit;" he also called the song "aggressive." Steve Beebee, of Kerrang!, was also positive toward the song, stating that the song "is as storming an opener as anyone could wish for," also feeling that Hale "flex(es) her remarkable vocal muscles" on the song. Live Metal's Greg Maki called the song an "all-out metallic assault." An album review by Loudwire commented that the song "is the perfect representation of Halestorm and a great showcase of frontwoman Lzzy Hale’s voice and badass wit."

Japanese all-female metal band Lovebites derived their name from the song.

Accolades
At the 2013 Grammy Awards, the song received the award for Best Hard Rock/Metal Performance.

Music video
A music video for the song, directed by Jeremy Alter, was released on February 14, 2012. The video features black-and-white footage of the band performing.

Charts

Weekly charts

Year-end charts

References

2012 songs
Halestorm songs
Songs written by Dave Bassett (songwriter)
Songs written by Lzzy Hale
American heavy metal songs